Loukas Kanakaris-Roufos (23 August 1878 – 11 November 1949) was a Greek politician.

He was the son of Athanasios Kanakaris-Roufos and a member of the Rouphos family. In the 1905 elections he became a member of the Greek Parliament but failed to be re-elected in 1906. In 1908 however, he succeeded his brother Ioannis Roufos in his parliament seat after his death. In 1913, he resigned his seat and became Governor-General of Crete, a post he held during the island's official union with Greece in December 1913 and until April 1915. Soon after he was re-elected into Parliament, and in September 1916 he became Minister for the Interior. Despite his friendship with Eleftherios Venizelos, he sided with King Constantine I during the National Schism. Following Venizelos' victory in 1917, he was imprisoned until 1920. In the 1920 elections he was again elected to Parliament. In 1922 he served twice briefly as Minister for National Economy, in March–April and from May until the outbreak of the 1922 Revolution in September. In between, he headed the Greek delegation to the talks at Genoa aimed at resolving the ongoing Greco-Turkish War.

On 20 September 1925, he was appointed Minister for National Education and Religious Affairs in the dictatorial government of Theodoros Pangalos, and on 6 November he became Foreign Minister. He failed to be elected in the 1932 elections, but succeeded again in the 1936 elections, the last before the Metaxas dictatorship and World War II. He died at Athens on 11 November 1949.

He was married to Eleni Papageorgakopoulou and had a son, the diplomat and writer Rodis Kanakaris-Roufos.

References

The first version of the article was translated from the subject's article on Greek Wikipedia .

1878 births
1949 deaths
MPs of Patras
Foreign ministers of Greece
Governors-General of Crete
Roufos family
Greek MPs 1905–1906
Greek MPs 1910–1912
Politicians from Patras